Gnanasekaran is a given name. Notable people with the name include:

 C. Gnanasekaran, Indian politician
 Ramaswamy Gnanasekaran (born 1954), Indian sprinter
 Sathiyan Gnanasekaran (born 1993), Indian intelligence officer

Hindu given names
Indian masculine given names